Manolis Rovithis (born 16 September 1992) is a Greek professional footballer who plays as a left winger.

Career
Rovithis started his career from the youth team of Vyzas Megara in 2009. A year later he signed a professional contract with the club and moved to the first squad, where he played 33 league games in the Football League and Gamma Ethniki (3rd National Category). On 27 August 2012 he moved to Super League club OFI Crete. He competed with the Cretan club in the Greek Super League for almost 3 years. On 12 July 2015 he freed himself from his contract, after the dissolution of the team due to major financial problems, and after 10 days, on 23 July 2015, he moved to AEL and signed for 3 years. After a year's stay, on 9 August 2016, he left the club on mutual consent to return to OFI. His second stay was abruptly ended early in 2017 however, as he was not part of coach Nioplias' plans. Rovithis then had a brief stint with Football League side Sparti until the end of the 2016−17 season, before returning to Crete in September 2017 to play for fellow Football League side Ergotelis. His season with the Cretans abruptly came to an end due to suffering ACL rupture injuries twice during the season. As a token of their support, Ergotelis renewed Rovithis' contract for another year during his recovery period. He managed a full recovery from his injuries, and repaid his club's support with his most productive season yet, scoring six goals in 17 league matches, mostly coming in as a substitute.

Career statistics

Honours
Levadiakos
Super League 2: 2021–22

References

External links
 onsports.gr (Greek)
 myplayer.gr (Greek)
 superleaguegreece.net (Greek)
 cretalive.gr (Greek)
 athleticradio.gr (Greek)
 

1992 births
Living people
Greek expatriate footballers
Super League Greece players
Football League (Greece) players
OFI Crete F.C. players
Athlitiki Enosi Larissa F.C. players
Ergotelis F.C. players
Footballers from Heraklion
Greek footballers
Association football forwards